The Carrizo Christ is an 11th-century ivory carving and is conserved in the Museo de León, León (Spain). The piece came from the Cistercian monastery of Santa María de Carrizo located some 16 miles west of León.

The figure of Christ is impressive due to the size of the head and his largue eyes wide open. Hands and feet as well are conceived out of proportion to the rest of the body.

See also
Crucifix of Ferdinand and Sancha

References

Bibliography

11th-century sculptures
Ivory works of art
Crucifixes
Romanesque sculptures